Kevin Lamey is a Jamaican footballer who plays for Humble Lions F.C. in the top flight Jamaica National Premier League.

External links

1975 births
Living people
Jamaican footballers
Jamaica international footballers
Jamaican expatriate sportspeople in Malaysia
Expatriate footballers in Malaysia
Expatriate footballers in Trinidad and Tobago
TT Pro League players
Jamaican expatriate footballers
Expatriate soccer players in the United States
Expatriate soccer players in Canada
Waterhouse F.C. players
Seattle Sounders (1994–2008) players
Montreal Impact (1992–2011) players
Kuala Lumpur City F.C. players
Sri Pahang FC players
A-League (1995–2004) players
Humble Lions F.C. players
National Premier League players
Association football forwards
People from Saint Catherine Parish